Shengle was the capital of the Xianbei-led Dai state and the first capital of the Northern Wei dynasty in the 4th century. The ruins of ancient Shengle is located at present-day Xiyaozi and Tuchengzi village, Shengle Township of Horinger County, 40 kilometre south of Hohhot, Inner Mongolia. 

During the Han dynasty, the city was part of the Dingxiang Commandery and known as Chengle County. Towards the end of the dynasty, the commandery was abandoned due to Xiongnu invasions. The city was then settled by Tuoba Liwei (219-277), the first leader of the Tuoba clan of the Xianbei. In 315, Tuoba Yilu became the first King of Dai and made Shengle the northern capital of Dai. Tuoba Gui, the grandson of the last Dai king, founded the Northern Wei empire. In 398, he moved the capital to the city of Pingcheng (modern-day Datong) in Shanxi Province.  The site would later become the capital of the Zhenwu County of the Liao dynasty.

Parts of the rammed-earth walls of the ancient city are still intact. The peripheral walls run 1,550 meters from east to west and 2,250 meters from north to south.

References 

Archaeological sites in China 
Major National Historical and Cultural Sites in Inner Mongolia 
Ruins in China
Northern Wei